"Balada" (full title "Balada (Tchê Tcherere Tchê Tchê)", also known as "Balada Boa") is a song by Brazilian artist Gusttavo Lima from his album Gusttavo Lima e você (2011). Written by Gusttavo Lima and Cássio Sampaio, it was released on 21 January 2011, in Brazil through label Som Livre. The song became a success in Brazil: it reached the 3rd position on the Brazilian Billboard Hot 100.

International fame came when the popular song was released worldwide on 13 April 2012, through label Universal. The song became a success in most of Europe, just as Michel Teló's song "Ai Se Eu Te Pego", becoming a number-one hit in Belgium (Flanders), France, Honduras, Italy, Luxembourg and the Netherlands (13 weeks at number one in the Dutch Top 40, a new record).

Track listing 

Digital download / Promotional CD single
 "Balada (Tchê Tcherere Tchê Tchê)" – 3:22
Tacabro Remix digital download
"Balada (Tchê Tcherere Tchê Tchê)" (Tacabro Remix Radio Edit) – 2:50
"Balada (Tchê Tcherere Tchê Tchê)" (Tacabro Remix) – 4:36
Regi Remix digital download/CD single
"Balada (Tchê Tcherere Tchê Tchê)" (Regi Remix) – 6:03
"Balada (Tchê Tcherere Tchê Tchê)" (Regi Remix Radio Edit) – 4:07
Latin Remixes EP
"Balada (Tchê Tcherere Tchê Tchê)" – 3:35
"Balada (Tchê Tcherere Tchê Tchê)" – 5:36
"Balada (Tchê Tcherere Tchê Tchê)" – 3:11
"Balada (Tchê Tcherere Tchê Tchê)" – 4:21
"Balada (Tchê Tcherere Tchê Tchê)" – 5:09
Italian CD single
"Balada (Tchê Tcherere Tchê Tchê)" (Original Version) – 3:22
"Balada (Tchê Tcherere Tchê Tchê)" (A-Class Edit) – 3:11
"Balada (Tchê Tcherere Tchê Tchê)" (Tacabro Remix Radio Edit) – 2:50
"Balada (Tchê Tcherere Tchê Tchê)" (Club Edit)
"Balada (Tchê Tcherere Tchê Tchê)" (A-Class Floor Mix) – 4:18
"Balada (Tchê Tcherere Tchê Tchê)" (Tacabro Remix) – 4:36
"Balada (Tchê Tcherere Tchê Tchê)" (Sagi Abitbul Remix) – 4:20
"Balada (Tchê Tcherere Tchê Tchê)" (Feeling Valencia Mix)
"Balada (Tchê Tcherere Tchê Tchê)" (Axento Extended Remix)
"Balada (Tchê Tcherere Tchê Tchê)" (Club Mix)
German Digital EP
"Balada (Tchê Tcherere Tchê Tchê)"  – 3:22
"Balada (Tchê Tcherere Tchê Tchê)" (A-Class Edit) – 3:11
"Balada (Tchê Tcherere Tchê Tchê)" (A-Class Floor Mix) – 4:18
"Balada (Tchê Tcherere Tchê Tchê)" (Sagi Abitbul Remix) – 4:20
German CD single
"Balada (Tchê Tcherere Tchê Tchê)"  – 3:22
"Balada (Tchê Tcherere Tchê Tchê)" (A-Class Edit) – 3:11

Remix featuring Dyland & Lenny 

After the huge success of "Balada" in France starting April 2012, and attaining #1 in the SNEP charts in June 2012, and only after the single started descending from its top position in France, a new bilingual Portuguese/Spanish version was released in France and United States, with the new release credited to "Gusttavo Lima featuring Dyland & Lenny", being the Puerto-Rican reggaeton artists Carlos Castillo Cruz (known as Dyland) and Julio Manuel González Tavarez (known as Lenny).

The SNEP charts started crediting this bilingual version "Gusttavo Lima featuring Dyland & Lenny" on chart dated week-ending 30 July 2012, after crediting just Gusttavo Lima in all earlier charts.

The duo also has released earlier a version named "Balada Boa" crediting "Dyland & Lenny featuring Gusttavo Lima".

Formats 
Digital download
"Balada (Tchê Tcherere Tchê Tchê)" – 3:46

Charts

Weekly charts

Certifications

Year-end charts

Release history

Other versions

Mikael Del Lago version 
Mikael Del Lago has released various version of Sertanejo songs including versions of "Balada" on Believe Digital record label as follows:
Balada (Live 2012)
Balada Boa (French Live Version)
Balada (Tribute to Gusttavo Lima) [Version Live]
Tchê Tcherere Tchê Tchê (French Live Version)
Tchê Tcherere Tchê Tchê (Tribute to Gusttavo Lima) [Version Live]

Mikael Del Lago's "Tchê tcherere tchê tchê (Tribute to Gusttavo Lima)" reached #164 SNEP French Singles chart in May 2012.

Karaoke Hits Band version 
Karaoke Hits Band released its own version entitled "Balada Boa". It reached #114 on SNEP French Singles chart in May 2012.

See also 
List of Dutch Top 40 number-one singles of 2012
List of Ultratop 50 number-one singles of 2012
List of number-one hits of 2012 (France)
List of number-one hits of 2012 (Switzerland)
List of number-one hits of 2012 (Italy)
List of Billboard number-one Latin songs of 2012

References 

2011 songs
2011 singles
Portuguese-language songs
Dutch Top 40 number-one singles
SNEP Top Singles number-one singles
Number-one singles in Honduras
Number-one singles in Italy
Number-one singles in Switzerland
Ultratop 50 Singles (Flanders) number-one singles